Shield Row is a village in County Durham, in England. It is situated immediately to the north of Stanley.  To the north is Tanfield village.

Pubs include: -

- The Ball Alley
- The Blue Bell Inn
- The Board Inn
- South Causey Hotel

The sustrans C2C route runs through the village, crossing the roads by bridges, one of which was recently built for that purpose.

The village has one primary school (shield Row primary School)

External links

Villages in County Durham
Stanley, County Durham